Kang Eun-hye (born March 28, 1988), better known by her stage name  Viki, or Baek Da-eun  is a South Korean singer and actress. She is a former member of the South Korean girl group Dal Shabet.

Personal life
Viki was born on 28 March 1988. She attended Dongduk Women's University and studied Bachelor of Music and Entertainment.

Career

2011–2012: Career beginnings
Viki made her debut through the release of Supa Dupa Diva with Dal Shabet on January 3, 2011. Promotions for "Supa Dupa Diva" began on January 6, 2011, on Mnet's M! Countdown.

However, in May 2012, it was announced that Viki would be leaving the group to continue her career as a solo artist. She was replaced by Bae Woo-hee.

2014–2015: Solo activities
After leaving the group, Viki made her film debut in 2014 in the film A Pharisee, Nice Sister-In-Law in 2015 and erotic films P.S. Girls and Challenge Game in 2016.

Viki signed with MBK Entertainment under her new name Baek Da-eun, but left the company in 2016.

After appearing in several erotic films, Viki revealed in 2015 that she was tricked by her acting agency to do said films. She later sued the agency and found out that the agency was operating illegally.

Discography

Filmography

Film

Television drama

References

External links

1988 births
Dal Shabet members
K-pop singers
Living people
MBK Entertainment artists
South Korean female idols
South Korean women pop singers
South Korean film actresses
South Korean television actresses